The Northern Border Regional Commission is an American federal-state partnership for community and economic development in counties near the Canada–United States border.

History
The Northern Border Commission (NBC) was created as part of the Food, Conservation, and Energy Act of 2008. As of 2021, the NBC has been reauthorized twice.

Governance
Modeled off the Appalachian Regional Commission, the NBC is led by a federal co-chair and the respective state governors. The federal co-chair nominated by the president of the United States and confirmed by the United States Senate. One of the governors is designated a state co-chair.

Federal co-chair
Chris Saunders was confirmed by the Senate on March 24, 2022, and began service on April 11, 2022.

List of federal co-chairs:
 Sanford "Sandy" Blitz of Maine (2010-2014)
 Mark Scarano (2015-2018)
 Harold B. Parker (2018-2022)
 Chris Saunders (2022-present)

Service area
The service area consists of upstate New York, most of Maine and New Hampshire, and all of Vermont.

See also
 Appalachian Regional Commission
 Delta Regional Authority
 Denali Commission
 List of local government organizations
 Southeast Crescent Regional Commission
 Tennessee Valley Authority

References

External links
 

2008 establishments in the United States
Economic development organizations in the United States
Government agencies established in 2008
Government of Maine
Government of New Hampshire
Government of New York (state)
Government of Vermont
Rural development in the United States
United States federal boards, commissions, and committees